Megasporaceae are a family of fungi belonging to the order Pertusariales. Taxa are lichenized with green algae, and grow on rocks, often in maritime climates close to fresh water. Phylogenetic analysis has shown that this family is related to the Pertusariaceae, another family of lichens. The genus Aspicilia was moved here from the Hymeneliaceae.

Genera
Genera of this family include:
 Aspicilia  – ca. 200 spp.
 Aspiciliella  – 2 spp.
 Circinaria  – 31 spp.
 Lobothallia  – 17 spp.
 Megaspora  – 4 spp.
 Oxneriaria  – 9 spp.
 Sagedia  – 12 spp.
 Teuvoa  – 5 spp.

References

Pertusariales
Lichen families
Taxa named by Helge Thorsten Lumbsch
Taxa described in 1994
Lecanoromycetes families